Mears is an unincorporated community and census-designated place (CDP) in Golden Township, Oceana County, Michigan, United States.

History 
The community was founded by mill owner Charles Mears in 1873. A post office opened in May 1873.

Geography 
The Silver Lake Sand Dunes are the biggest attraction in Mears, bringing in over a million visitors in a year. 

The Mears ZIP code, 49436, includes most of Golden Township as well as small areas of Pentwater Township to the north, Hart Township to the east, and Benona Township to the south.

Mears was first listed as a CDP prior to the 2020 census.

Demographics

References 

Census-designated places in Oceana County, Michigan
Census-designated places in Michigan
Unincorporated communities in Oceana County, Michigan
Unincorporated communities in Michigan
Populated places established in 1873